Fleetwood is a town in Lancashire, England.

Fleetwood may also refer to:

Places

Canada
 Fleetwood, Surrey, British Columbia

United States
 Fleetwood, Pennsylvania, borough in Berks County, Pennsylvania
 Fleetwood, a neighborhood in the US city of Mt. Vernon, New York
 Fleetwood (Metro-North station), a railroad station located in that neighborhood
Fleetwood Park Racetrack, a defunct horse racing track in New York City, New York

People
 Fleetwood (surname)
 Bernard Fleetwood-Walker (1893–1965), English artist and painting teacher
 Moses Fleetwood Walker (1857–1924), American baseball player
 Fleetwood (noble family), Swedish Baronial family
 Fleetwood baronets
 Fleetwood Pellew (1789–1861), British Royal Navy admiral

Ships and boats
 HMS Fleetwood, name of two ships of the British Royal Navy
 Fleetwood (steamboat), steamboat that once ran on Columbia River and Puget Sound

Other uses
 Fleetwood (novel), a novel by William Godwin
 Fleetwood Metal Body, automobile coachbuilder
 Cadillac Fleetwood Brougham
 Cadillac Fleetwood
 The Fleetwoods, singing trio from Olympia, Washington, USA
 Fleetwood Mac, British and American rock band and the name of two albums
Fleetwood Mac (1968 album)
Fleetwood Mac (1975 album)
 Fleetwood—Port Kells, Canadian federal electoral district
 Blackpool North and Fleetwood (UK Parliament constituency)
 Fleetwood Enterprises, U.S. manufacturer
 Fleetwood Town F.C., football club in Fleetwood, England

See also
 Threepwood (disambiguation)